The 25th Golden Raspberry Awards, or Razzies, were held on February 26, 2005, at the Ivar Theatre in Hollywood, California, to honor the worst films the film industry had to offer in 2004. To celebrate the 25th anniversary of the Golden Raspberry Awards, four special categories—Worst Razzie Loser of Our First 25 Years, Worst "Comedy" of Our First 25 Years, Worst "Drama" of Our First 25 Years, and Worst "Musical" of Our First 25 Years—were created.

This edition of the Razzies was notable as the first to give nominations to a movie that was neither a critical nor a box-office bomb: the Palme d'Or winning documentary Fahrenheit 9/11. It received nominations not because the movie itself was of poor quality, but because the film depicted political figures' mishandling of the September 11 attacks and the Iraq War. The Razzies, which had previously steered clear of politics, received criticism from some quarters for nominating the performances of George W. Bush, Donald Rumsfeld, and Condoleezza Rice. (The former two won their awards while Britney Spears won the Razzie for Worst Supporting Actress over Rice; her role in Fahrenheit 9/11 is just fifteen seconds long.)

Leading the pack was a tie between the late summer film Catwoman and Fahrenheit 9/11, each of which won four Razzies, even though the latter was not nominated for Worst Picture. Catwoman received the greatest number of nominations (seven), followed by Alexander with six nominations.

The Ivar Theatre was rented using proceeds from an auction of Ben Affleck's broken trophy from the previous year, which Affleck smashed during an appearance on Larry King Live.

Halle Berry collected her award in person. She was the first to do so since 2001, when Tom Green arrived to receive his five Razzies for Freddy Got Fingered. Berry was quoted as saying "If you aren't able to be a good loser you're not able to be a good winner." Berry mocked her 2002 Oscar acceptance speech, acting tearful and saying, "I never thought this would happen to me." She then responded to some critics by holding up her Oscar and saying, "They can't take it away, my name's on it!" Screenwriter Michael Ferris also appeared to pick his Worst Screenplay award.

Winners and nominees

Special "Worst of Our First 25 Years" Awards

Films with multiple nominations 
These films received multiple nominations:

See also

 2004 in film
 77th Academy Awards
 58th British Academy Film Awards
 62nd Golden Globe Awards
 11th Screen Actors Guild Awards

References

Golden Raspberry Awards
Golden Raspberry Awards ceremonies
2005 in California
2005 in American cinema
February 2005 events in the United States
Golden Raspberry